Sieroczyn  is a village in the administrative district of Gmina Człuchów, within Człuchów County, Pomeranian Voivodeship, Poland.

For details of the history of the region, see History of Pomerania.

The village has a population of 193.

References

Sieroczyn